Methylocystis echinoides is a bacterium species from the genus of Methylocystis.

References

Further reading 
 
 
 

Methylocystaceae
Bacteria described in 1993